Granite High School may refer to: 

Granite High School (Montana), Philipsburg, Montana
Granite High School (Oklahoma), Granite, Oklahoma
Granite High School (Utah), South Salt Lake, Utah
Granite Bay High School, Granite Bay, California
Granite City High School, Granite City, Illinois
Yellow Medicine East High School, Granite Falls, Minnesota
Granite Falls High School, Granite Falls, Washington
Granite Hills High School (Porterville, California), Porterville, California
Granite Hills High School (Apple Valley, California), Apple Valley, California
Granite Hills High School (El Cajon, California), El Cajon, California
Raymond Granite High School, Raymond, California